Filip Salač (born 12 December 2001) is a Czech motorcycle rider, currently competing 2022 Moto2 World Championship for Team Gresini Moto2.

Career

Junior career
Salač competed full time in the 2016 Red Bull MotoGP Rookies Cup, scoring no podiums, 75 points, and finished 9th in the final standings. He also made four race appearances in the 2016 FIM CEV Moto3 Junior World Championship, scoring one point in the race at Portimão.

Salač split the same two series again next year, finishing with 12 points in the 2017 FIM CEV Moto3 Junior World Championship, and five top-6 finishes in the 2017 Red Bull MotoGP Rookies Cup, including a 2nd place podium in Jerez. He finished 27th, and 13th in the standings respectively.

Salač improved from his previous seasons in both categories, scoring points eight times in the 2018 FIM CEV Moto3 Junior World Championship, seven of which were top-10 finishes, finishing 11th in the standings, with 52 points. In the 2018 Red Bull MotoGP Rookies Cup, he scored five podiums, two second places at Assen and Misano, and three third places at Jerez, the Sachsenring, and the Red Bull Ring. He finished the season 4th in the standings, with 151 points.

Moto3 World Championship
He made his Grand Prix racing debut as a wildcard, at his home GP in Brno in 2018, finishing the race in 24th place.

Redox PrüstelGP (2019)
Salač competed full time in the 2019 Moto3 World Championship alongside compatriot Jakub Kornfeil at Prüstel GP.

He scored points in seven races during the year, his season's best finishes being a 9th place in Rimini, and a 5th place in the season closing race in Valencia. He ended the season 23rd in the standings, with 32 points.

Rivacold Snipers Team (2020–2021)
Switching from Prüstel to the Rivacold Snipers team for the 2020 Moto3 World Championship, Salač had similar performances as the year prior. He scored points in six races, his season's best results were an 8th place in Qatar, and a 9th place in Valencia, and ended the season 21st in the standings, with 30 points.

The 2021 Moto3 World Championship would see Salač ride for two teams. He started the season with the Rivacold Snipers outfit, scoring his first career podium in the category with a 2nd place in Le Mans, and also earning his first Pole Position in Moto3 at the Sachsenring. He could not finish the race in Germany however, as technical issues forced him to retire. Salač was so upset with the team, having already retired in Doha and Barcelona in previous races, that following his German retirement, he asked for the termination of his contract with the team. He was replaced by Alberto Surra.

CarXpert Prüstel GP (2021)
Following his decision to leave the Snipers team, and the sudden death of Jason Dupasquier in Italy freeing up a spot at Prüstel GP, the two parties agreed to a contract, and Salač would ride for Prüstel for the remaining 9 races of the season. He finished in the points in the first three races, before crashing out in the next three, but ended the season well, with two 10th places in Misano and Portimão, before capping off the season with a 4th place in the season closer at Valencia. Salač finished 16th in the championship standings, with 71 points.

Moto2 World Championship

Gresini Racing Moto2 (2022–)
In September of 2021, it was announced that Salač would move up to Moto2, with the Gresini Racing team for the 2022 season.

Career statistics

Red Bull MotoGP Rookies Cup

Races by year
(key) (Races in bold indicate pole position; races in italics indicate fastest lap)

FIM CEV Moto3 Junior World Championship

Races by year
(key) Races in bold indicate pole position; races in italics indicate fastest lap)

Grand Prix motorcycle racing

By season

By class

Races by year
(key) (Races in bold indicate pole position; races in italics indicate fastest lap)

 Half points awarded as less than two thirds of the race distance (but at least three full laps) was completed.

Supersport 300 World Championship

By season

Races by year
(key) (Races in bold indicate pole position; races in italics indicate fastest lap)

References

External links
 
 Profile on Red Bull Rookies Cup

2001 births
Living people
Czech motorcycle racers
Moto3 World Championship riders
Sportspeople from Mladá Boleslav
Supersport 300 World Championship riders
Moto2 World Championship riders